José Mukendi Tshilumba (born 1961 in Zaire) (sometimes spelled Mokendi) played international football for Zaire and club football for Derry City and Finn Harps. He died in London in 2006 at the age of 45.

His son, Marc, played for Derry, Finn Harps and Coleraine.

References

External links

1961 births
2006 deaths
Democratic Republic of the Congo footballers
Democratic Republic of the Congo expatriate footballers
Democratic Republic of the Congo international footballers
Expatriate association footballers in the Republic of Ireland
League of Ireland players
Derry City F.C. players
Finn Harps F.C. players
Association footballers not categorized by position
21st-century Democratic Republic of the Congo people